Barre Auditorium is a 1,856-seat multi-purpose arena in Barre, Vermont. It was built in 1939. It was one of the homes of the Vermont Frost Heaves of the Premier Basketball League, along with the Burlington Memorial Auditorium. While the University of Vermont's Patrick Gymnasium hosts all Division I high school basketball semifinal and finals, the Barre Auditorium is the site of all Division II, III, and IV semifinal and finals.

References

External links
 Official Website

American Basketball Association (2000–present) venues
Indoor arenas in Vermont
Sports venues in Vermont
Basketball venues in Vermont
1939 establishments in Vermont
Buildings and structures in Barre (city), Vermont
Sports venues completed in 1939